The Global Partnership for the Prevention of Armed Conflict (GPPAC) is a member-led network of civil society organisations (CSOs) active in the field of conflict prevention and peacebuilding across the world. The network is organised around 15 regional networks of local organisations, each region having its own priorities, character and agenda. Each region is represented in an International Steering Group, which determines joint global priorities and actions. GPPAC was initiated through extensive consultations in 2003-4, and officially launched as part of a global conference in 2005 at the UN headquarters in New York.

As part of its mission to work towards a global shift from reaction to prevention of violent conflict, GPPAC strives towards multi-actor collaboration and local ownership. Together, GPPAC members aim to achieve greater synergy in the field of conflict prevention and peacebuilding  by connecting different levels (from national to regional and global), and to strengthen the role of local civil society groups in conflict regions.

GPPAC supports the capacity of the regional networks to interact and act together, and facilitates regional and global exchanges, where members from different parts of the world come together and learn from each other's experiences and develop joint strategies. GPPAC also connect its members with other relevant actors, including the UN, regional intergovernmental organisations, state actors, the media and academia. This has enabled unique initiatives, showing GPPAC’s ability to bridge global policy making with local ownership and practice on the ground.

Achievements of GPPAC so far have included:

 Greater access and direct involvement of local civil society in policy processes such as the Geneva Declaration on Armed Violence and Development and UN initiatives such as the UN Peacebuilding Commission;
 Mobilisation of the global network in support of local CSOs - through tools, advice, contacts, political leverage or international civil society delegations – contributing to efforts to prevent or constrain violence in times of crisis or political change, as seen during the post-election crisis in Kenya, the political transition in Guinea Conakry, and clashes in Kyrgyzstan;
 The development of a Preventive Action framework to enable CSOs to engage from the stage of conflict assessment to the implementation and monitoring of conflict prevention strategies;
 Promotion of networks and dialogue initiatives (track II diplomacy) in the Caucasus, Latin America and other politically sensitive regions such as South Asia and Northeast Asia (Ulaanbaatar Process);
 Initiation of a dialogue and collaboration between CSOs and regional organisations such as the OAS, ECOWAS, SAARC and ASEAN on security issues
 Increased capacity of CSOs to work together in reaching out to the media and policy makers through ‘Media Focal Points’, quiet diplomacy workshops and policy liaison functions.
 Setting up of the Peace Portal, an online platform that is being custom-built to support the interaction, information-sharing and joint action of actors and initiatives in the conflict prevention and peacebuilding field.
 A global mapping of expertise and initiatives within the GPPAC network related to the UN Security Council Resolution 1325 on Women, Peace and Security

Main programme areas
GPPAC focuses on the following thematic priorities:

 Preventive Action: developing effective tools and operational capacities to mobilise action and enable CSOs to contribute to preventing conflict in collaboration with other key stakeholders
 Dialogue & Mediation: building capacity and mobilising the expertise within the network to directly support dialogue and mediation efforts in conflict situations
 Peace Education: enhancing methodologies for formal and informal education that fosters a culture of dialogue and peaceful handling of conflict, and collaborating with governments to institutionalise such initiatives in educational and local authority systems
 Human Security: developing a bottom-up approach to Security, by providing the input of grassroots CSOs in the development and implementation of security strategies including DDR, SSR, measures to address violent extremism, and civil-military interventions.
 Gender and UNSCR 1325 as a cross-cutting priority for GPPAC themes and strategies.

GPPAC has also launched the Peace Portal January 2012. The Peace Portal is a unique online platform for learning, sharing and collaborating in the conflict prevention and  peacebuilding field. It aims to bring people together and transform their online work into active, more effective peacebuilding. The Portal encourages information sharing and participation from civil society and grassroots organisations, whose voices often can not find the online visibility they need. Open to everybody, the Peace Portal is an important tool for GPPAC, to support its peacebuilding activities.

Regional Secretariats
The Global Partnership for the Prevention of Armed Conflict consists of fifteen regions. They are:
 Eastern and Central Africa
 West Africa
 Southern Africa
 Latin America and the Caribbean
 North America
 South Asia
 The Pacific
 Southeast Asia
 Northeast Asia
 Central Asia
 Middle East and North Africa
 Eastern Europe
 The Caucasus
 Western Balkans
 Northern and Western Europe

References

External links
GPPAC Charter 
GPPAC Website 
GPPAC 2005 Global Conference
Peace Portal
GPPAC Northeast Asia

Peace organizations
Organizations established in 2003
International organisations based in the Netherlands
International Campaign to Abolish Nuclear Weapons